The following companies manufacture timpani.

Mass producers 
 Adams Musical Instruments
 Ludwig Drums
 Majestic Percussion
 Premier Percussion
 Yamaha Corporation

Historical 
These companies no longer produce timpani, but their instruments are still widely used.

 American Drum Manufacturing Company
 Boosey & Hawkes
 Rogers Drum Company
 Slingerland Drum Company

.Timpani manufacturers
Timpani